Ashutosh Mehta (born 21 February 1991) is an Indian professional footballer who plays as a defender.

Club career

Mumbai
The 2010–11 season got off to a good start for Mehta as he made his debut for Mumbai in the 2010 Federation Cup against HAL. He then made his I-League debut for Mumbai against East Bengal on 2 November 2010.

Mumbai City
In July 2015 Mehta was drafted to play for Mumbai City in the 2015 Indian Super League.

ATK Mohun Bagan FC
On 6 July 2021, ATK Mohun Bagan FC confirmed the signing of Mehta on its social media and various other platforms for the 2021–22 season. He has been released on May 15, 2022.

International career
On 2 March 2021, Mehta was selected for the 35-man-squad national camp ahead of India national team's friendlies against Oman and UAE. On 25 March, he made his debut against Oman, which ended as 1–1.

Career statistics

Club

Honours
Aizawl

I-League: 2016–17

Mohun Bagan

I-League: 2019–20

References

External links

Ashutosh Mehta at the-aiff.com

Indian footballers
1991 births
Living people
I-League players
Mumbai FC players
Indian Super League players
FC Pune City players
Mumbai City FC players
Footballers from Mumbai
Association football midfielders
Association football fullbacks
India international footballers